The 1972–73 Cypriot Cup was the 31st edition of the Cypriot Cup. A total of 36 clubs entered the competition. It began on 13 May 1973 with the preliminary round and concluded on 17 June 1973 with the final which was held at GSP Stadium. APOEL won their 8th Cypriot Cup trophy after beating Pezoporikos Larnaca 1–0 in the final.

Format 
In the 1972–73 Cypriot Cup, participated all the teams of the Cypriot First Division, the Cypriot Second Division and 8 of the 14 teams of the Cypriot Third Division (first eight of the league table; cup took place after the end of the league).

The competition consisted of six knock-out rounds. In all rounds each tie was played as a single leg and was held at the home ground of the one of the two teams, according to the draw results. Each tie winner was qualifying to the next round. If a match was drawn, extra time was following. If extra time was drawn, there was a replay at the ground of the team who were away for the first game. If the rematch was also drawn, then extra time was following and if the match remained drawn after extra time the winner was decided by penalty shoot-out.

The cup winner secured a place in the 1973–74 European Cup Winners' Cup.

Preliminary round 
In the preliminary round participated 8 teams of 1972–73 Cypriot Third Division.

First round 
14 clubs from the 1972–73 Cypriot First Division and 14 clubs from the 1972–73 Cypriot Second Division were added.

Second round

Quarter-finals

Semi-finals

Final

References

Sources

Bibliography

See also 
 Cypriot Cup
 1972–73 Cypriot First Division

Cypriot Cup seasons
1972–73 domestic association football cups
1972–73 in Cypriot football